Papiamento or Papiamentu is a Portuguese-based creole language spoken in the Dutch Caribbean. It is the most widely spoken language on the Caribbean ABC islands (Aruba, Bonaire, Curaçao), with official status in Aruba and Curaçao. Papiamento is also a recognised language in the Dutch public bodies of Sint-Eustatius and Saba.

Due to lexical similarities between Spanish and Portuguese, it is difficult to pinpoint the exact origin of some words. Though there are different theories about its origins, most linguists now believe that Papiamento emerged from the Spanish and Portuguese creole languages that developed in the West African coasts, as it has many similarities with Cape Verdean Creole and Guinea-Bissau Creole.

History 

There are various theories about the origin and development of the Papiamento language, and precise history has not been established. Its parent language is surely Iberian, but scholars disputed whether Papiamento was derived from Portuguese and its derived Portuguese-based creole languages or from Spanish. Historical constraints, core vocabulary, and grammatical features that Papiamento shares with Cape Verdean Creole and Guinea-Bissau Creole are far less than those shared with Spanish, even though the Spanish and Dutch influences occurred later, from the 17th century onwards. Jacoba Bouschoute made a study of the many Dutch influences in Papiamento.

Spain claimed dominion over the islands in the 15th century but made little use of them. Portuguese merchants had been trading extensively in the West Indies and with the Iberian Union between Portugal and Spain during 1580–1640 period, their trade extended to the Spanish West Indies. In 1634, the Dutch West India Company (WIC) took possession of the islands, deporting most of the small remaining Arawak and Spanish population to the continent (mostly to the Venezuelan west coast and the Venezuelan plains, as well as all the way east to the Venezuela Orinoco basin and Trinidad), and turned them into the hub of the Dutch slave trade between Africa and the Caribbean.

The first evidence of widespread use of Papiamento in Aruba and Curaçao can be seen in official documents in the early 18th century. In the 19th century, most materials in the islands were written in Papiamento including Roman Catholic school books and hymnals. In 1837, the Catecismo Corticu pa uso di catolicanan di Curaçao was printed, the first printed book in Papiamento. In 2009 the Catecismo Corticu was added to the UNESCO Memory of the World register. The first Papiamento newspaper was published in 1871 and was called Civilisadó (The Civilizer).

Local development theory 
One local development theory proposes that Papiamento developed in the Caribbean from an original Portuguese-African pidgin, with later Dutch and Spanish (and even some Arawak) influences.

Another theory is that Papiamento first evolved from the use in the region since 1499 of 'lenguas' and the first repopulation of the ABC Islands by the Spanish by the Cédula real decreed in November 1525 in which Juan Martinez de Ampués, factor of Española, had been granted the right to repopulate the depopulated Islas inútiles of Oroba, Islas de los Gigantes, and Buon Aire.

The evolution of Papiamento continued under the Dutch colonisation under the influence of 16th-century Dutch, Portuguese (Brazilian) and Native American languages (Arawak and Taíno), with the second repopulation of the ABC islands with immigrants who arrived from the ex-Dutch Brazilian colonies.

The Judaeo-Portuguese population of the ABC islands increased substantially after 1654, when the Portuguese recovered the Dutch-held territories in Northeast Brazil, causing most Portuguese-speaking Jews and their Portuguese-speaking Dutch allies and Dutch-speaking Portuguese Brazilian allies in those lands to flee from religious persecution. The precise role of Sephardic Jews in the early development is unclear, but Jews certainly played a prominent role in the later development of Papiamento. Many early residents of Curaçao were Sephardic Jews from Portugal, Spain, Cape Verde or Portuguese Brazil. Also, after the Eighty Years' War, a group of Sephardic Jews immigrated from Amsterdam. Therefore, it can be assumed that Judaeo-Portuguese was brought to the island of Curaçao, where it gradually spread to other parts of the community. The Jewish community became the prime merchants and traders in the area and so business and everyday trading was conducted in Papiamento. While various nations owned the island, and official languages changed with ownership, Papiamento became the constant language of the residents.

When the Netherlands opened economic ties with Spanish colonies in what are now Venezuela and Colombia in the 18th century students on Curaçao, Aruba, and Bonaire were taught predominantly in Spanish, and Spanish began to influence the creole language.
Since there was a continuous Latinisation process (Hoetink, 1987), even the elite Dutch-Protestant settlers eventually communicated better in Spanish than in Dutch, as a wealth of local Spanish-language publications in the 19th century testify.

European and African origin theory 
According to the European and African origin theory the origins of Papiamento lie in the Afro-Portuguese creoles that arose in the 16th century in the west coast of Africa and in the Portuguese Cape Verde islands. From the 16th to the late 17th centuries, most of the slaves taken to the Caribbean came from Portuguese trading posts in those regions. Around those ports, several Portuguese-African pidgin and creole languages developed, such as Cape Verdean Creole, Guinea-Bissau Creole, Angolar, and Forro (from São Tomé). The sister languages bear strong resemblance with Papiamento. According to this theory, Papiamento was derived from one or more of these older creoles or their predecessors, which were brought to the ABC islands by slaves and traders from Cape Verde and West Africa.

The similarity between Papiamento and the other Afro-Portuguese creoles can be seen in the same pronouns used, being Portuguese-based.

Guene (the name comes from "Guinea") was a secret language that was used by slaves on the plantations of the landhouses of West Curaçao. There were about a hundred Guene songs that were sung to make the work lighter. However, because of the secret character of Guene, it never had much influence on Papiamento.

Linguistic and historical ties with Upper Guinea Portuguese Creole 
Since the late 1990s, research has been done that shines light on the ties between Papiamento and Upper Guinea Portuguese Creole. Martinus (1996), Quint (2000) and Jacobs (2008, 2009a, 2009b) focus specifically on the linguistic and historical relationships with the Upper Guinea Portuguese Creole, as spoken on the Santiago island of Cape Verde and in Guinea-Bissau and Casamance.   

In Bart Jacob's study The Upper Guinea Origins of Papiamento he defends the hypothesis that Papiamento is a relexified offshoot of an early Upper Guinea Portuguese Creole variety that was transferred from Senegambia to Curaçao in the second half of the 17th century, when the Dutch controlled the island of Gorée, a slave trading stronghold off the coast of Senegal. The Creole was used for communication among slaves and between slaves and slave holders.

On Curaçao, this variety underwent internal changes as well as contact-induced changes at all levels of the grammar, but particularly in the lexicon, due to contact with Spanish and, to a lesser extent, Dutch. Despite the changes, the morphosyntactic framework of Papiamento is still remarkably close to that of the Upper Guinea Creoles of Cape Verde and Guinea-Bissau. Parallels have also been identified between the development of Papiamento and Catholicism.)

Present status 
Papiamento is spoken in all aspects of society throughout Aruba, Curaçao and Bonaire. 

Papiamento has been an official language of Aruba since May 2003. In the former Netherlands Antilles, Papiamento was made an official language on 7 March 2007. After the dissolution of the Netherlands Antilles, Papiamento's official status was confirmed in the newly formed Caribbean Netherlands. Also, 150,000 Antillians (mostly from Curaçao) live in the Netherlands and speak their mother language, Papiamento, fluently. Some Papiamento is also spoken on Sint Maarten and the Paraguaná Peninsula of Venezuela.

Venezuelan Spanish and American English are constant influences today. Code-switching and lexical borrowing from Spanish, Dutch and English among native speakers is common. This is considered as a threat to the development of the language because of the loss of the authentic and Creole "feel" of Papiamento.

Many immigrants from Latin America and the Caribbean choose to learn Papiamento because it is more practical in daily life on the islands. For Spanish-speakers, it is easier to learn than Dutch, because Papiamento uses many Spanish and Portuguese words.

Old Papiamento texts 

The Papiamento language originates from about 1650. The oldest Papiamento texts that have been preserved are written letters. In the following three letters you can see that words changed and the spelling then was more conform the Dutch spelling. Some words are no longer in use and replaced by others. But the basis of Papiamento did not change much.

Piter May letter 1775 

The oldest letter dates from 1775. It was sent by the Sephardic Jew Abraham Andrade to his mistress Sarah Vaz Parro, about a family meeting in the centre of Curaçao.

Boo Jantje letter 1783

The next letter dates from 1783 and was recently discovered in an English archive. It was sent by Anna Charje in the name of her baby Jantje Boufet to her husband Dirk Schermer in Rotterdam. (The final sentence is standard Dutch.)

Quant Court testimony 1803

The third text dates from 1803. It is a court testimony in which 26 Aruban farm workers sign a statement to support their boss Pieter Specht against false accusations by Quant.

Orthography and spelling

Papiamento is written using the Latin script.

Since the 1970s, two different orthographies have been developed and adopted. In 1976, Curaçao and Bonaire officially adopted the Römer-Maduro-Jonis version, a phonetic spelling. In 1977, Aruba approved a more etymology-based spelling, presented by the Comision di Ortografia (Orthography Commission), presided by Jossy Mansur.

Distribution and dialects 

Papiamento has two main dialects, one in Aruba and one in Curaçao and Bonaire (Papiamentu), with lexical and intonational differences. There are also minor differences between Curaçao and Bonaire.

Spoken Aruban Papiamento sounds much more like Spanish. The most apparent difference between the two dialects is given away in the name difference. Whereas Bonaire and Curaçao opted for a phonology-based spelling, Aruba uses an etymology-based spelling. Many words in Aruba end with "o" while the same word ends with "u" in Bonaire and Curaçao. And even in Curaçao, the use of the u-ending is still more pronounced among the Sephardic Jewish population. Similarly, the use of "k" in Bonaire and Curaçao replaces "c" in Aruba.

For example:

Phonology

Vowels and diphthongs 
Papiamento vowels are based on Ibero-Romance and Dutch vowels. Papiamento has the following nine vowels:

Papiamento has diphthongs, two vowels in a single syllable that form one sound. 
Papiamento diphthongs are based on Ibero-Romance and Dutch diphthongs. It has the following diphthongs:

Stress and accent 
Stress is very important in Papiamento. Many words have a very different meaning when a different stress is used:

 When both syllables are equally stressed, it means "to eat".
 When the first syllable is stressed, it means "eat!" (imperative). 
 However,  (short for ) means "eat it!"

There are general rules for the stress and accent but also a great many exceptions.
When a word deviates from the rules, the stressed vowel is indicated by an acute accent ( ´ ), but it is often omitted in casual writing.

The main rules are: 
 When a word ends in a vowel (a, e, i, o, u), the stress is placed upon the penultimate (before last) syllable:  ("donkey").
 When a word ends not in a vowel, but with a consonant, the stress is placed upon the last syllable: .
 When a verb has two syllables, the syllables are about equally stressed:  ("to care"),  ("to lack").
 When a verb has more than two syllables, the stress is laid upon the last syllable:  ("to answer"),  ("to promise").

Lexicon

Vocabulary 
Most of the vocabulary is derived from Portuguese and its derived Portuguese-based creoles and (Early Modern) Spanish. The real origin is usually difficult to tell because the two Iberian languages are very similar, and adaptations were made in Papiamento. A list of 200 basic Papiamento words can be found in the standard Swadesh list, with etymological reference to the language of origin. There is a remarkable similarity between words in Papiamento, Cape Verdean Creole, and Guinea-Bissau Creole, which all belong to the same language family of the Upper Guinea Creoles. Most of the words can be connected with their Portuguese origin.

Linguistic studies have shown that roughly 80% of the words in Papiamento's present vocabulary are of Iberian origin, 20% are of Dutch origin, and some of Native American or African origin. A study by Van Buurt and Joubert inventoried the words of Taíno and Caquetío Arawak origin, mostly words for plants and animals. Arawak is an extinct language that was spoken by Indians throughout the Caribbean. The Arawak words were re-introduced in Papiamento by borrowing from the Spanish dialect of Venezuela

Many words are of Iberian origin, and it is impossible to label them as either Portuguese or Spanish:
  ("please") – Spanish:  – Portuguese: 
  ("madam") – Spanish:  – Portuguese: 
  ("which") – Spanish:  – Portuguese: 
  ("how much") – Spanish:  – Portuguese: 

While the presence of word-final  can easily be traced to Portuguese, the diphthongisation of some vowels is characteristic of Spanish. Also, a sound shift may have occurred in the direction of Spanish, whose influence on Papiamento came later than that of Portuguese:  ("nephew"):  in Portuguese,  in Spanish.

Portuguese-origin words:
  ("butterfly") – Portuguese: 
  ("dog") – Portuguese: 
  ("black") – Portuguese: 
  ("power") – Portuguese: 

Spanish-origin words:
  ("city") – Spanish: 
  ("hat") – Spanish: 
  ("trousers") – Spanish: 
  ("man") – Spanish: 

Dutch-origin words:
  ("apple") – Dutch: 
  ("book") – Dutch: 
  ("to read") – Dutch: 
  ("March") – Dutch: 

English-origin words:
  – English: back
  – English: bottle
  – English: bicycle

African-origin words:
  ("peanut") – Kongo: 
  ("white man") – Bantu: 
  ("to kneel") – Wolof: 
  ("wasp") – Bantu: 

Native American-origin words:
  ("hurricane") – Taíno: 
  ("corn") – Taíno: 
  ("farm") – Taíno: 
  ("ugly") – Arawak:

Literature and culture
Aruba and Bonaire's national anthems are in Papiamento, "Aruba Dushi Tera" and "Tera di Solo y suave biento" respectively. The newspaper Diario is also in the language.

The 2013 films Abo So (Aruba) and Sensei Redenshon (Curaçao) were the first feature films in Papiamento; the comedy Bon Bini Holland (Curaçao and Netherlands) also contains some Papiamento.

Examples

Phrase and word samples 
  (How are you?) – Portuguese: 
  (How is life?) – Spanish:  – Portuguese: 
  (please) – Spanish:  – Portuguese: 
  (Thank you) – Dutch: 
  (Not yet) – Portuguese: 
  (Your mother is very beautiful) – Portuguese: 
  (During my school years) – Portuguese: 
  (Argue) – Portuguese: 
  (Fight) – Portuguese: 
  (Good) – Portuguese

Expressions 
  (A lot of foam, little chocolate): Too good to be true.
  (That is where the pig's tail curls): That is where the problem lies.
  (Quick soup turns salty): Good things take time.
  (He wants to fly with wings of butter): He wants to do more than he can handle.
  (Just before dawn, the night is darkest): When need is greatest, salvation is near.

Lord's Prayer 
The Lord's Prayer in a register of Papiamento used liturgically by the Roman Catholic Church, compared with Spanish, Portuguese, and King James English:

Comparison of vocabularies 

This section provides a comparison of the vocabularies of Papiamento, Portuguese, and the Portuguese creoles of Guinea-Bissau and Cape Verde. Spanish is shown for the contrast.

See also 
 Kristang language (Papia Kristang, Malaccan Creole Portuguese)
 Creole language
 Portuguese-based creole languages
 Monogenetic theory of pidgins
 Linguistics
 Joceline Clemencia

References

Bibliography 

 
 
 
 Jacobs, Bart (2009). "The Origins of Old Portuguese Features in Papiamento". FPI/UNA, Curaçao.

Dictionaries 
 Mansur, Jossy (1991). "Dictionary English-Papiamento Papiamento-English". Edicionnan Clasico Diario, Oranjestad. 
 Ratzlaff, Betty (2008). "Papiamento-Ingles, Dikshonario Bilingual". TWR Jong Bonaire. 
 Joubert, Sidney (2007). "Handwoordenboek Papiaments-Nederlands". Joubert Press, Willemstad. 
 Van Putte, Florimon; Van Putte-De Wind, Igma (2005). "Groot Woordenboek Papiaments Nederlands". Walburg Press, Zutphen 
 Kramer, Johannes (2015). "Etymologische Studien zum Papiamento". Buske Verlag, Hamburg.
 N.N., Los Editores (1876). GUIA para los españoles hablar papiamento y viceversa: Para que los de ...
 Marugg, Tip (1992). "Dikshonario Erotiko Papiamentu". Scherpenheuvel, Curaçao.
 Banko di Palabra – basic dictionary, based on the Unesco sponsored Papiamento spell checker
 Majstro English-Papiamento dictionary
 Glosbe English-Papiamento dictionary

Grammar 
 Goilo, Enrique R. (2000). "Papiamentu Textbook". De Wit Stores, Oranjestad.
 Blankenburg, Eleanor (1986). "Basic Papiamentu Grammar for English Speakers". Blankenburg Edition, Bonaire. 
 Frans-Muller, Xiomara (2017). "Papia Papiamentu ku mi". Expert book, Bonaire.

External links 

 Papiamento.aw, the Papiamento-language website of the Aruba government (in Papiamento)
 Aruba Papiamento language grammar (in Papiamento) 
 Aruba Papiamento spelling and orthography rules (in Papiamento) 
 Aruba Papiamento official wordlist
 Curaçao and Bonaire Papiamentu official wordlist and orthography (in Papiamentu) 
 Sorosoro, information on Papiamento
 Diario, newspaper in Papiamento
 Nostisia, newspaper in Papiamento
 Bible fragments in Papiamento
 Papiamentu tur dia – A blog for English-speaking students of Papiamento
 "A Language Thrives in Its Caribbean Home" – Article by Simon Romero in The New York Times

 
Portuguese-based pidgins and creoles
Languages of Aruba
Languages of the African diaspora
Spanish-based pidgins and creoles